Sylvester Hanson was a member of the Wisconsin State Assembly, representing the 2nd district of Walworth County. He served as a Republican during the Session of 1862.

References

Republican Party members of the Wisconsin State Assembly
Year of birth missing
Year of death missing